The 2012 LPGA Tour was a series of weekly golf tournaments for elite female golfers from around the world that began in Australia on February 9 and ended November 18 in Florida. The tournaments are sanctioned by the United States-based Ladies Professional Golf Association (LPGA).

Season overview
There were 27 official tournaments on the 2012 LPGA Tour, four more than in 2011. Fifteen tournaments were held in the United States. Eleven other countries hosted the remaining twelve tournaments.

Stacy Lewis won the most tournaments, four, and won the Player of the Year award. Inbee Park won two tournaments and both the money title with earnings of $2,266,638 and the Vare Trophy for lowest scoring average. So Yeon Ryu won Rookie of the Year honors, winning one tournament, finishing sixth on the money list and second in scoring average.

Other players winning multiple tournaments were Yani Tseng with three wins and Na Yeon Choi, Ai Miyazato, Suzann Pettersen, and Jiyai Shin with two wins each.

Changes for 2012

Five additional events
ISPS Handa Women's Australian Open in February at Royal Melbourne - existing event now co-sanctioned by LPGA
LPGA Lotte Championship in Hawaii in April; LPGA returned to Oahu after a two-year hiatus
Manulife Financial LPGA Classic in Canada in June 
Jamie Farr Toledo Classic in Ohio in August; returned after a year off
Kingsmill Championship in Virginia in September; LPGA returned to Williamsburg after a two-year absence. Scheduled to move to May in 2013.
source: LPGA 2012 Schedule

Final major delayed
The Ricoh Women's British Open was moved from its usual late-July date to mid-September, to accommodate the 2012 Summer Olympics in London which were being held in London.

Schedule and results
The number in parentheses after winners' names is the player's total number wins in official money individual events on the LPGA Tour, including that event.

1 Unofficial events
* Lydia Ko was an amateur when she won the CN Canadian Women's Open; the winner's share went to the runner-up, Inbee Park.

Season leaders
Money list leaders

Full 2012 Official Money List

Scoring average leaders

Full 2012 Scoring Average List

See also
2012 Ladies European Tour
2012 Symetra Tour

References

External links
Official site

LPGA Tour seasons
LPGA Tour